Red Hook may refer to:

Places
Red Hook, Brooklyn, a neighborhood in Brooklyn, New York City, United States
Red Hook graving dock, a graving dock formerly located in Red Hook, Brooklyn
Red Hook, New York, a town in Dutchess County in the State of New York, United States
Red Hook (village), New York, a village in the Town of Red Hook, New York, United States
Red Hook, USVI, an area of Saint Thomas, United States Virgin Islands

Other
 "The Horror at Red Hook", a 1927 short story by H. P. Lovecraft, set in Red Hook, Brooklyn
 Red Hook (FBI), a surveillance tool developed by the Federal Bureau of Investigation
 Red Hook, a novel by Reggie Nadelson

See also
 Redhook (disambiguation)